Tramea carolina, the Carolina saddlebags, is a species of dragonfly native to eastern North America.

Description
The length of the Carolina saddlebags measures . The thorax and basal part of each wing is brown. The eighth and ninth abdominal segments are black. In females, the abdomen and face are brownish red, and the basal part of the forehead is violet. In males, the abdomen and face are bright red, and the entire forehead is violet. Juvenile males resemble females.

Distribution and habitat
The Carolina saddlebags is found from southern Nova Scotia to Florida and Bermuda west to Texas. It is seen all year in Florida and from May to August in Canada. Its habitats include ponds, lakes, swamps, and streams. It is not found near muddy water.

Behavior
They perch on the tips of stems or other objects.

References

Libellulidae
Odonata of North America
Insects described in 1763
Taxa named by Carl Linnaeus